William Power may refer to:

Australia 
 Bill Power (Australian politician) (1893–1974), member of the Queensland Legislative Assembly
 William Grene Power (1835–1903), member of the Queensland Legislative Council
 Will Power (born 1981), Australian motorsport racer
 Bill Power (footballer) (born 1937), Australian rules footballer who played with South Melbourne
 Billy Power (footballer) (1917–2002), Australian rules footballer who played with Footscray

Canada 

 William Power (Canadian politician) (1849–1920), member of the Canadian House of Commons
 William Gerard Power (1882–1940), his son, Canadian politician in Quebec
 William Power (Quebec judge) (1800–1860), judge and political figure in Lower Canada
 William Edward Power (died 2003), Roman Catholic Bishop of Antigonish, 1960–1986
 William Patrick Power (1843–1919), Canadian priest and head of Duquesne University

United Kingdom 
 William Power (Scottish politician) (1873–1951), leader of the Scottish National Party
 William Henry Power (1842–1916), Chief Medical Officer of England
 William Power, member of the Birmingham Six

United States 
 William Patrick Power (1843–1919), first rector of the Pittsburgh Catholic College
 Will Power (performer), American actor, rapper and playwright
 Bill Power (outlaw), member of the Dalton Gang

See also
 William Powers (disambiguation)
 Will Power (disambiguation)